Dale or Dale i Sunnfjord is the administrative centre of the municipality of Fjaler in Vestland county, Norway.

In December 2013, the new Dalsfjord Bridge, connecting Dale with Askvoll Municipality on the northern side of the fjord was opened and replaced the ferry route between Dale and Eikenes.

Also located in Dale is the Nordic Artists' Centre Dale, an artist-in-residence centre hosting international visual artists over periods of 2 or 3 months.

Notable residents
Jakob Sande (1906–1967): Norwegian writer, poet, and folk singer.

References

External links
http://www.fjaler.origo.no Fjaler kommune website managed by the locals.
http://www.fjaler.kommune.no Home page for the municipality

Villages in Vestland
Fjaler